Yaniv Altshuler, (born 1978) is an Israeli computer scientist and entrepreneur. He is a researcher at the MIT Media Lab, at the Human Dynamics group headed by professor Alex Pentland.

In 2014 he co-founded Endor, an MIT spinoff, financially backed by Eric Schmidt, that offers analytics to help understand, predict, and influence the dynamics of human behavior.

Together with Pentland, Altshuler is one of the creators of Social Physics – a theory that describes mathematical laws that govern the behavior of human crowds.

Biography 
Altshuler received his Ph.D in Computer Science from the Technion in Israel, under the supervision of Prof. Alfred Bruckstein and Dr. Israel Wagner, focusing on the optimization of Drone Swarms. After graduating from the Technion and before arriving to MIT he was a post-doctoral researcher at Deutsche Telekom Innovation Laboratories 
at Ben-Gurion University, working with the lab’s director, Prof. Yuval Elovici.

He is also an alumnus of the Technion Rothschild Excellence program.

He spent 2011-2013 as a post-doctoral researcher at MIT studying networks and the way they evolve and act as a medium which people use to interact. Together with Prof. Pentland he took part in the creation of the new science of Social Physics.

Work 
Altshuler’s research interests include machine intelligence, swarm systems, urban computing and collaborative security. He edited the book Security and Privacy in Social Networks, and is a co-author on the book Swarms and Network Intelligence.

In 2007 he has co-founded Memoraze, a start-up company in the field of behavior analysis in computer games.

His work on the way social networks can be used for improving financial trading returns, known as “Network Tuning”, was the first to demonstrate how an efficient integration of a large number of insights from retail investors can significantly outperform the returns of professional investors, as reported by Financial Times and Harvard Business Review.

Altshuler was also the leading researcher in the “Stealing Reality” project that had shown how anonymized phone data can be used to accurately reveal personal information about the phone users, as well as the “Social Amplifier” project, that demonstrated the usage of real-time analysis of billions of phone calls for homeland security. This research was covered by AOL news, PC World, the Communications of the ACM, and other publications.

In 2014 he co-founded Endor, an MIT spinoff that uses Social Physics for an automatic on-demand prediction of consumer behaviors, and provides answers to plain language business questions. The company was funded among others by Eric Schmidt.

Altshuler has published over 60 academic papers, and 15 patents.

References

External links 
 MIT Home Page of Altshuler
 
 Social Physics homepage at MIT Media Lab
 Social Physics research and videos
 Social Physics in Finance - video of Altshuler discussing the new science
 Social Physics YouTube video channel
 Stealing Reality: When Criminals Become Data Scientists - Extended Abstract
 Endor Home Page
 FirstMark - Rethinking Predictive Analytics - video of Altshuler's presentation

1978 births
Living people
Israeli computer scientists
Technion – Israel Institute of Technology alumni